Hydrogen sulfide chemosynthesis is a form of chemosynthesis which uses hydrogen sulfide. It is common in hydrothermal vent microbial communities Due to the lack of light in these environments this is predominant over photosynthesis

Giant tube worms use bacteria in their trophosome to fix carbon dioxide (using hydrogen sulfide as their energy source) and produce sugars and amino acids.  Some reactions produce sulfur:

 hydrogen sulfide chemosynthesis:
 18H2S + 6CO2 + 3O2 → C6H12O6 (carbohydrate) + 12H2O + 18S

In the above process, hydrogen sulfide serves as a source of electrons for the reaction. Instead of releasing oxygen gas while fixing carbon dioxide as in photosynthesis, hydrogen sulfide chemosynthesis produces solid globules of sulfur in the process. In bacteria capable of chemoautotrophy (a form a chemosynthesis), such as purple sulfur bacteria, yellow globules of sulfur are present and visible in the cytoplasm.

References 

Biochemistry
Metabolism
Organisms living on hydrothermal vents
Ecosystems
Environmental microbiology
Biological processes